John Arlos Tuma (born September 25, 1962) is an American lawyer and politician in the state of Minnesota. He served in the Minnesota House of Representatives. In 2015 Governor Mark Dayton appointed Tuma to the Minnesota Public Utilities Commission.

References

1962 births
Living people
Republican Party members of the Minnesota House of Representatives